Mexico and Slovenia are both members of the Organisation for Economic Co-operation and Development and the United Nations.

History
Mexico recognized the newly independent Slovenia on 22 May 1992. Diplomatic relations were established on the same day when former Slovenian President Milan Kučan and former Mexican President Carlos Salinas de Gortari exchanged official letters. In 1996, Mexico opened an honorary consulate in Ljubljana.

In 1998, Slovenian Ambassador, Dimitrij Rupel, declared that there are deep bilateral relations between his country and Mexico, and that Slovenia will support Mexico in any international forum, since Mexico is part of the North American Free Trade Agreement (NAFTA), which provides opportunities to increase commerce and investments between Slovenia and North America. In October 1998, Prime Minister Janez Drnovšek became the first Slovene head of state to visit Mexico.

In August 2003, both nations participated in the Mixed Commission for Cooperation in the fields of Education and Culture. Both sides underlined that the session of the Mixed Commission presented a good opportunity for the establishment of foundations for mutual relations in the fields of education, science, culture and sport, as well as for reflection on the role of international co-operation as a factor for social change and as an essential means for the realisation of global and sustainable development of countries. To this end, the signatories started a programme of cooperation for the period 2003 to 2007, in which the two countries agreed on mutual collaboration in the fields of primary, secondary, post-secondary and higher education; scholarship and residential exchange programmes. 

In May 2006, former Mexican President Vicente Fox met with former Slovene Prime Minister Janez Janša in Vienna, where both leaders were attending the IV Latin America, the Caribbean and the European Union Summit. In December 2007, Foreign Minister Patricia Espinosa Cantellano became the high-level Mexican official to visit Slovenia and she met with Slovenian Prime Minister Janez Janša.

Bilateral visits

High-level visits from Mexico to Slovenia

 Foreign Secretary Patricia Espinosa Cantellano (December 2007)

High-level visits from Slovenia to Mexico

 Foreign State Secretary Ignac Golob (August 1996)
 Prime Minister Janez Drnovšek (October 1998)
 Foreign Minister Dimitrij Rupel (May 2004)

Bilateral agreements
Both nations have signed a few bilateral agreements such as an Agreement on Educational and Cultural Cooperation (1996) and a Memorandum of Understanding for the Establishment of a Mechanism of Consultation in Matters of Mutual Interest (1996).

Trade
In 1997, Mexico signed a Free Trade Agreement with the European Union (which includes Slovenia). In 2017, two-way trade between both nations amounted to US$164 million. Mexico's exports to Slovenia include: chemicals, automobile parts, tequila and beer; while Slovenia's main exports to Mexico include: automobile and machinery parts and computer wires. Eleven Slovenian companies currently operate in Mexico. Slovenia is the 26th biggest foreign direct investor to Mexico from the European Union.

Non-resident diplomatic missions
 Mexico is accredited to Slovenia from its embassy in Vienna, Austria and has an honorary consulate in Ljubljana.
 Slovenia is accredited to Mexico from its embassy in Washington, D.C.; United States, and has an honorary consulate in Mexico City.

See also  
 Foreign relations of Mexico
 Foreign relations of Slovenia 
 Mexico–EU relations
 Mexico–Yugoslavia relations

References 

 
Slovenia
Bilateral relations of Slovenia